Chester Hougen (April 10, 1907 – March 25, 1982) was an American politician who served in the Iowa House of Representatives from the 66th district from 1961 to 1965 and in the Iowa Senate from the 32nd district from 1967 to 1971.

He died on March 25, 1982, in Leesburg, Florida at age 74.

References

1907 births
1982 deaths
Republican Party members of the Iowa House of Representatives
Republican Party Iowa state senators